None Shall Defy is the debut album by Infernäl Mäjesty. It was originally released in 1987 by Roadrunner Records and re-issued in 1996 on cd by Displeased Records with bonus tracks originally appearing on their "Nigresent Dissolution" Demo in 1988.

Track listing
  "Overlord"   – 5:57
  "R.I.P."  – 1:13
  "Night of the Living Dead"  – 7:20
  "S.O.S."  – 4:50
  "None Shall Defy"  – 6:45
  "Skeletons in the Closet"  – 3:51
  "Anthology of Death"  – 6:51
  "Path of the Psycho"  – 1:53
  "Into the Unknown"  – 5:11  (Bonus on Reissue) 
  "Hell on Earth"  – 8:10  (Bonus on Reissue)

Credits
 Chris Bailey– vocals 
 Steve Terror– guitar 
 Rick Nemes– drums (vocals on "Path of the Psycho") 
 Kenny Hallman– guitar
 Psycopath– bass

References

Infernäl Mäjesty albums
1987 debut albums